Tam, kde hnízdí čápi is a 1975 Czechoslovak drama film directed by Karel Steklý.

Cast
 Jiří Krampol
 Milena Svobodová
 Adolf Filip
 Zdeněk Kryzánek
 Gustav Opočenský
 Jan Skopeček
 Miloš Willig
 Josef Vinklář
 Antonín Hardt
 Jiří Holý
 Vlasta Fialová

References

External links
 

1975 films
1975 drama films
Czech drama films
Czechoslovak drama films
1970s Czech-language films
Films directed by Karel Steklý
1970s Czech films